Neal Cheetham (February 10, 1845 – January 28, 1917) was an American politician in the state of Washington. He served in the Washington House of Representatives from 1895 to 1897.

References 

Members of the Washington House of Representatives
State auditors of Washington
1845 births
1917 deaths
Politicians from Pittsburgh
19th-century American politicians